Supratisthitavarman ruled Kamarupa from the Varman dynasty for the period 595–600. He was son of King Susthitavarman and Queen Shyamadevi.

Reign
It is stated in Bhaskaravarman's inscription that "surrounded by learned men and accompanied by a well equipped army consisting of war-elephants his (Supratisthitavarman's) birth (rise) was for the good of others".
Supratisthitavarman introduced many reforms during his rule. He not able to reign for long and died during the life-time of his father. He was succeeded by his younger brother Bhaskaravarman, who actually enjoyed the fruit of his hard work, i.e. a well-organised army.

See also
 Mahendravarman
 Narayanavarman

References

Further reading
  
 
 
 
 
 
 
 
 
 
 
 
 

Varman dynasty
6th-century Indian monarchs